The 2022–23 Marquette Golden Eagles women's basketball team represented Marquette University in the 2022–23 NCAA Division I women's basketball season. The Golden Eagles, led by fourth year head coach Megan Duffy, played their home games at the Al McGuire Center and are members of the Big East Conference.

Previous season 

The Golden Eagles finished the season at 23–11 and 13–7 in Big East play to finish in fifth place. They defeated DePaul in the quarterfinals of the Big East women's tournament before losing to UConn in the semifinals.

Offseason

Departures

Incoming transfers

Recruiting

Roster

Schedule

|-
!colspan=9 style=| Regular season

|-
!colspan=9 style=|Big East Tournament

|-
!colspan=9 style=|NCAA tournament

Rankings

*The preseason and week 1 polls were the same.^Coaches did not release a week 2 poll.

See also
 2022–23 Marquette Golden Eagles men's basketball team

References

Marquette Golden Eagles women's basketball seasons
Marquette
Marquette
Marquette
Marquette